FiiO Electronics Technology Company, Ltd., or simply FiiO, is a Chinese electronics company founded in 2007 that primarily manufactures audio equipment. Its products include portable music players, audio amplifiers and DACs, earphones, as well as various cables and accessories

References

Electronics companies established in 2007
Portable audio player manufacturers
Audio equipment manufacturers of China
Manufacturing companies based in Guangzhou
Chinese companies established in 2007